Congiu is a surname. Notable people with the surname include:

Pierangelo Congiu (born 1951), Italian sprint canoeist
, Italian poet